No Pokies was an independent South Australian Legislative Council ticket that ran upper house candidates at the 1997, 2002 and 2006 state elections. Poker machines or "pokies" are the Australian version of slot machines. It was replaced by the Nick Xenophon Team in 2013.

Independents elected from this ticket consist of:

 Nick Xenophon, barrister and anti-gambling campaigner, elected in 1997 on 2.9 percent with preferences and again in 2006 on 20.5 percent
 Ann Bressington, anti-drugs campaigner, elected in 2006 as Xenophon's first of two running mates
 John Darley, former valuer-general, third running mate in 2006 was appointed on 21 November 2007 to replace outgoing MP Nick Xenophon, re-elected in 2014

Federal politics
Xenophon resigned from the South Australian Legislative Council in early October 2007 to stand for the Australian Senate as an independent at the 2007 federal election in which he was successful, on a primary vote of 14.78 percent. ABC election analyst Antony Green had stated prior to the election that Xenophon would win a seat, while Centrebet speculated his odds would start on a favourable $1.50 for and $2.70 against. Nick Minchin "urged people not to vote for Mr Xenophon", with the Liberal Party's 2006 upper house vote only 5.5 percent higher, and polled lower than Xenophon in some booths.

Xenophon's federal platform consists of anti-gambling, pro-consumer protection, attention to the water crisis, ratifying Kyoto, opposition against what he calls a decrease in state rights, and opposition to WorkChoices. Xenophon shared the balance of power with the Greens and Family First during the 2008–11 Senate parliamentary session, with the Greens holding the sole balance of power since July 2011. Xenophon has been reported in the media as "left-of-centre", whilst Hansard reveals that Xenophon and the Greens have found common ground on a number of issues.

Parliamentarians

Federal 
Senator Nick Xenophon (SA), 2008–2017 (elected in 2007, continues for Nick Xenophon Team)

State

South Australia
John Darley MLC, 2007–current (left successor party in 2017)
Ann Bressington MLC, 2006–2014 (left party in 2013)
Nick Xenophon MLC, 1997–2007

References

External links
 Nick Xenophon for the Senate 2007
 2002 No Pokies upper house preferential legislative council ticket.
 2006 No Pokies upper house preferential legislative council ticket.

Defunct political parties in Australia
Gambling in Australia
Single-issue political parties